Hamid Notghi (1920–1999) was an Iranian poet, writer, author, university professor. Notghi Founder and father of modern public relations in Iran.

Literary works 
Javad Heyat founded Varliq magazine in 1979 with Hamid Notghi. There are also many works of public relations, poetry and prose.
 One hour with Qaani
 Books management and public relations
 Beliefs and political propaganda
 Wine Road (Persian short stories)
 Of any color (Azerbaijani lyrics)
 From yesterday to today (Azerbaijani lyrics)
 End of the Millennium (Azerbaijani lyrics)

Award of Dr. Hamid Notghi 

International Conference on Public Relations of Iran Award of Dr. Hamid Notghithat, a scientific prize in the national and international levels in order to appreciate service, are given in the development and promotion of public relations. The most famous award winners are Mohammad Bagher Ghalibaf, a previous Mayor of Tehran, Abdollah Jassbi, a former president of Azad University, and Younes Shokrkhah.

References

External links 
 Prof. Ameli Wins Notghi PR Award (IBNA)
 2nd Global Congress for Muslim Public Relations Practitioners (GCMPRP) (International Conference on Public Relations of Iran)
 ELEVENTH INTERNATIONAL CONFERENCE ON PUBLIC RELATIONS HELD IN IRAN Explorers Public Relations

1920 births
1999 deaths
People from Tabriz
Azerbaijani-language poets
Istanbul University alumni
Istanbul University Faculty of Law alumni
University of Tehran alumni
20th-century Iranian poets
Iranian magazine founders
Iranian expatriates in the United Kingdom